Stenaelurillus fuscatus is  a jumping spider species in the genus Stenaelurillus that lives in Tanzania. The male was first described in 2000 from a holotype found in Mkomazi National Park. It is closely related to Stenaelurillus darwini and Stenaelurillus uniguttatus.

References

Spiders described in 2000
Fauna of Tanzania
Salticidae
Spiders of Africa
Taxa named by Wanda Wesołowska